The WUI Classic was a golf tournament on the LPGA Tour for six seasons, from 1977 to 1982. It was played at three different courses on Long Island, New York. The last four were played at Meadow Brook Club in Jericho.

The tournament sponsor was Western Union International.

Hall of famer Judy Rankin successfully defended her title in 1979 for her 26th and final tour win.

Tournament locations

Winners
WUI Classic
1982 Beth Daniel
1981 Donna Caponi
1980 Sally Little
1979 Judy Rankin (2)
1978 Judy Rankin

Long Island Charity Classic
1977 Debbie Austin

References

Former LPGA Tour events
Golf in New York (state)
Sports in Long Island
History of women in New York (state)